The 2016–17 season was Northampton Town's 120th season of existence and their first season back in League One after a seven-year absence. Along with competing in League One, the club participated in the FA Cup, EFL Cup and EFL Trophy.

The season ran from 1 July 2016 to 30 June 2017.

Players

Pre-season

Competitions

League One

League table

League position by match

Matches
On 22 June 2016, the fixtures for the forthcoming season were announced.

FA Cup

EFL Cup

On 22 June 2016, the first round draw was made with Northampton Town drawn away against Barnsley. On 10 August 2016, the second round draw was made with Northampton Town drawn at home against West Bromwich Albion. On 24 August 2016, the third round draw was made with Northampton Town drawn at home against Manchester United.

Checkatrade Trophy

On 27 July 2016, the group-stage draw was made with Northampton Town drawn in a group with a West Ham United XI, Coventry City and Wycombe Wanderers.

Group table

Appearances, goals and cards

Awards

Club awards
At the end of the season, Northampton's annual award ceremony, including categories voted for by the players and backroom staff, the supporters, will see the players recognised for their achievements for the club throughout the 2016–17 season.

Transfers

Transfers in

Transfers out

Loans in

Loans out

References

Northampton Town
Northampton Town F.C. seasons